Located in Auburn, Indiana, WGLL is a AM radio station transmitting on 1570 kHz at 500 watts during the daylight hours and 151 watts during the nighttime hours. The WGLL transmitter and its two towers are located along County Road 29 in Auburn, Indiana.

History
The station originally signed on the AM dial at 1570 kHz as WIFF on September 3, 1968. WIFF was owned by Frank Kovas of Kovas Communications. The station's call-sign was changed to WGLL on March 31, 1997; at this point, the station became a translator of WGL in Fort Wayne. WGLL signed off the air on October 3, 2002. On February 21, 2003, Frank Kovas donated the station to the Raymond S. and Dorothy N. Moore Foundation, along with his other remaining station W07CL. Due to his failing health, Kovas had already sold his other stations in the years preceding this. WGLL signed back on under the new management on April 14, 2003.

Management
The station is currently managed on behalf of the Moore Foundation by Ray Alexander. Alexander is a personal friend of Raymond Moore, and has helped launch a number of other ministries. The sister stations W07CL and WFWC-CD are also managed by Alexander. Although the station is owned by the Moore Foundation, it does not receive monetary support from them. WGLL is supported solely by local donations. With the lack of funding and local interest, the station had been declining rapidly over the past decade.

Programming
The current programming consists of a rebroadcast from a religious satellite feed 24 hours a day. Currently, no live personnel are on staff at the station.

External links

Three Angels Broadcasting Network radio stations
GLL